Larissa Inae da Silva (born 4 April 1994) is a Brazilian handballer who plays for the Brazilian national team.

Achievements
Liga Națională: 
Bronze Medalist: 2018
Torneio Quatro Nações:
Gold Medalist: 2017

References

1994 births
Living people
People from Jundiaí
Brazilian female handball players
Expatriate handball players
Brazilian expatriate sportspeople in Romania
Sportspeople from São Paulo (state)